Tushikuduk (Tushchıkuduk, تۋششىكۋدۋك), also known as Tushchyqudyq, is a town in Mangystau Region, southwest Kazakhstan.

References

Mangystau Region
Cities and towns in Kazakhstan